Ashok Tapiram Patil, also known as Nana Patil, is an Indian politician and a member of the 16th Lok Sabha. He represents the Jalgaon constituency of Maharashtra and is a member of the Bharatiya Janata Party (BJP) political party.

Political career
 1990-95 & 95-97: Corporator Parola Nagarpalika (two terms) 
 1998-2000: President Parola Nagarpalika
 2001-06: President Parola Nagarpalika
 2002-05: Chairman A.P.M.C Parola, District. Jalgaon
 31 August 2009: member, Committee on Defence, Consultative Committee, Ministry of Housing, Consultative Committee, Ministry of Urban Poverty Alleviation and Ministry of Tourism
 16 May 2014: re-elected to 16th Lok Sabha (2nd term)
 1 September 2014 onwards: member, Committee on Government Assurances; member, Standing Committee on Railways

Special interests
His interests include agriculture and defence affairs.

References 

 
 

Living people
1961 births
Bharatiya Janata Party politicians from Maharashtra
People from Maharashtra
India MPs 2009–2014
People from Jalgaon
Marathi politicians
Lok Sabha members from Maharashtra
India MPs 2014–2019